Hapi can refer to:

 Hapi (Nile god), an Egyptian river god
 Hapi (Son of Horus), an Egyptian funerary deity
 Hapi, Iran, a village in East Azerbaijan Province
 Hapi, a beer brand owned by Harbin Brewery
 Prince Hapi, a character in Around the World in 80 Days (2004 film) played by Arnold Schwarzenegger
 Helicopter Approach Path Indicator (HAPI), a type of aircraft Visual Glide Slope Indicator
 Healthy Americans Private Insurance Plans (HAPIs), which would have been established by the Healthy Americans Act, a failed Senate bill
 hapi (hapi.js), a web application server framework for Node.js
 Hapi (Hapi Corp.) is an financial services company that provides commission-free trades of stocks and cryptocurrencies

See also 
 Apis (deity), also spelled Hapis, an Egyptian god worshipped in Memphis
 Happi, a traditional Japanese coat
 Happi (film), a 2019 Bollywood film
 Happy (disambiguation)